The following is an alphabetical list of some of the minor characters in the Kalvan series.

Archpriest Anaxthenes
is the First Speaker of the Archpriests of Styphon's House.  He handles many of the duties that Supreme Priest Sesklos is unable to do.

Knight Commander Aristocles
is a close friend of Grand Master Soton.  He is a good commander.

Prince Balthames
is Prince Balthar's younger brother.  Under an agreement between Balthar and Sarrask of Sask, Balthames is married to Sarrask's daughter and becomes ruler of the new princedom of Sashta.

Prince Balthar
is the prince of the Princedom of Beshta.  After he betrays Prince Ptosphes at the Battle of Tenebra, he is executed and replaced by Prince Phrames.

Archpriest Cimon
is known as the "Peasant Priest" and is one of the few Archpriests who actually believes in Styphon.

Knight Commander Geox
was the commander of the Third Wedge, which was destroyed at the Battle of Chothros Heights.

Prince Gormoth
is the ruler of the Princedom of Nostor when Kalvan arrives.  He is killed after Nostor's defeat and replaced by Prince Pheblon.

Great King Kaiphranos
also known as Kaiphranos the Timid and Kaiphranos the Dotard, is the ruler of the fictional Great Kingdom of Hos-Harphax in H. Beam Piper's book Lord Kalvan of Otherwhen.  Kaiphranos is a very weak Great King, who does not exercise much control over his subject princes.  The princes are even free to wage open war on each other. 
Kaiphranos is well known in the Great Kingdoms as someone who wants to make flutes, not be king.  Kaiphranos' chancellor is given that post because he is able to endure listening to Kaiphranos' lectures on the proper type of reeds to use in flute making.

Commander Lestros
is the commander of the Eighteenth Lance of the Zarthani Knights.

Prince Pheblon
replaces Gormoth as Prince of Nostor and joins the new Great Kingdom of Hos-Hostigos.

Prince Ptosphes
rules the Princedom of Hostigos and is the father of Rylla, Kalvan's wife.

Archpriest Roxthar
is another one of the few Archpriests that believes in Styphon and begins an inquisition to root out the non-believers from Styphon's House.  As part of the deal regarding the creation of this inquisition, Roxthar is not allowed to investigate any Archpriests, many of whom do not believe in Styphon.

Warlord Ranjar Sargos
is the leader of the Grassmen.  He is a member of the Raven Tribe, which originally lived near the Great River.  He leads the Grassmen into the Sastragath, where they fight Kalvan's army, before joining Kalvan in the fight against the Zarthani Knights, their real enemy.

Knight-Sergeant Sarmoth
is a Zarthani Knight originally from Tarr-Syklos who brings Grand Master Soton the news that the Mexicotal are driving towards Xiphlon.  He is later assigned to Soton's command.  His oath brother is Longshanks.

Prince Sarrask
is the prince of the Princedom of Sask.  Initially one of Hostigos' enemies, he is a loyal prince to Kalvan, especially after the Battle of Tenebra.

Supreme Priest Sesklos
is the aged head of Styphon's House, being in his nineties.

Grand Master Soton
is the leader of the Holy Order of the Zarthani Knights and an Archpriest of Styphon's House.

Kalvan series